Blue Christmas is the twentieth studio and first Christmas album by Scottish Australian musician Jimmy Barnes, released on 25 November 2022 through Bloodlines. Speaking on his motivations to release a Christmas album, in a press statement, Barnes said, "One of the greatest surprises I ever got from our children was when they all snuck away into the garage and secretly recorded themselves singing carols for me. On Christmas morning, when I awoke, they proudly gave me the recording and sat eagerly waiting for me to listen to it. That year I received lots of great gifts from various family members, but that recording had me weeping like a baby. It was the most beautiful gift I ever got. This album is my gift back to the kids, the grandkids and everyone out there who just wants to sit and sing with their family on Christmas. These songs take me back and they remind me why I'm here right now. I hope they do the same for you."

The album was preceded by the title track, released on 21 October 2022.

The album debuted at number one on the ARIA Charts, becoming Barnes' 15th solo chart topper, extending the record for most Australian number one albums.

Track listing
 "Jingle Bell Rock" – 3:03
 "Have Yourself a Merry Little Christmas" – 4:44
 "Santa Claus Is Coming to Town" – 3:17
 "Let It Snow!" – 2:07
 "White Christmas" – 4:46
 "The Christmas Song (Chestnuts Roasting on an Open Fire)" – 3:19
 "Blue Christmas" – 2:10
 "Run Rudolph Run" – 3:21
 "Little Drummer Boy" – 3:59
 "Silent Night" – 4:14
 "Rockin' Around the Christmas Tree" – 2:17
 "Auld Lang Syne" – 4:35

Charts

Weekly charts

Year-end charts

Release history

References

2022 Christmas albums
Christmas albums by Australian artists
Jimmy Barnes albums